Cyril Norman Seedhouse (10 April 1892 – 21 January 1966) was a British athlete who competed mainly in the 400 metres.

He competed for Great Britain in the 1912 Summer Olympics held in Stockholm, Sweden in the 4 x 400-metre relay where he won the bronze medal with his teammates George Nicol, Ernest Henley and James Soutter.

During the First World War he served in the Royal Flying Corps and was injured in a dogfight that saw him drive off German Fokker aircraft.

References

1892 births
1966 deaths
British male sprinters
Olympic bronze medallists for Great Britain
Athletes (track and field) at the 1912 Summer Olympics
Olympic athletes of Great Britain
Medalists at the 1912 Summer Olympics
Olympic bronze medalists in athletics (track and field)